The family saga is a genre of literature which chronicles the lives and doings of a family or a number of related or interconnected families over a period of time. In novels (or sometimes sequences of novels) with a serious intent, this is often a thematic device used to portray particular historical events, changes of social circumstances, or the ebb and flow of fortunes from a multitude of perspectives.

The word saga comes from Old Norse, where it meant "what is said, utterance, oral account, notification" and "(structured) narrative, story (about somebody)", and was originally borrowed into English from Old Norse by scholars in the eighteenth century to refer to the Old Norse prose narratives known as sagas.

The typical family saga follows generations of a family through a period of history in a series of novels. A number of subgenres of the form exist such as the AGA saga.

Successful writers of popular family sagas include Susan Howatch, R. F. Delderfield and Philippa Carr.

Literature
 The sagas of Icelanders – the medieval Icelandic family sagas whence the word "saga" is derived
 Mahabharata, by Valmiki – the chronicle of the Chandravanshi Rajput clan founded by Puru, also considered the longest poem in human history
 Dream of the Red Chamber – one of the Four Great Classical Novels of Chinese literature, it chronicles the rise and decline of the Jia family
 A Chronicle of Ancient Sunlight, by Henry Williamson
 Ada or Ardor, by Vladimir Nabokov
 The Artamonov Business, by Maxim Gorky
 Brideshead Revisited, by Evelyn Waugh
 Beauty Is a Wound, by Eka Kurniawan
 Buddenbrooks, by Thomas Mann
 Captains and the Kings, by Taylor Caldwell
The Cairo Trilogy, by Naguib Mahfouz
 The Covenant, by James A. Michener
 The Crowthers of Bankdam, by Thomas Armstrong
 Dune, by Frank Herbert
 The Emberverse series, by S. M. Stirling
 Evergreen, by Belva Plain
 Fall on Your Knees, by Ann-Marie MacDonald
 Fire & Blood by George R. R. Martin
 The Forsyte Saga, by John Galsworthy
 The Golovlyov Family, by Mikhail Saltykov-Shchedrin
 The Good Earth and its sequels, by Pearl S. Buck
 Holes, by Louis Sachar
 Homegoing, by Yaa Gyasi
 The House of the Spirits, by Isabel Allende
 The Immigrants, by Howard Fast
 The Jalna books, by Mazo de la Roche
 The Kent Family Chronicles and The Crown Family Saga, by John Jakes
 Kristin Lavransdatter, by Sigrid Undset
 Os Maias, by Eça de Queiroz
 I Malavoglia, by Giovanni Verga
 The Mallens, by Catherine Cookson
 Middlesex, by Jeffrey Eugenides
 One Hundred Years of Solitude, by Gabriel García Márquez
 The Oppermanns, by Lion Feuchtwanger
 The Palaeologian Dynasty. The Rise and Fall of Byzantium, by George Leonardos
 The Promise, by Damon Galgut
 Radetzkymarsch (Radetzky March), by Joseph Roth
 Roma, by Steven Saylor
 Roots, by Alex Haley
 The Silmarillion, by J. R. R. Tolkien
 Strangers and Brothers, by C. P. Snow
 The Thibaults, by Roger Martin du Gard
 Time and the Wind, by Erico Verissimo
 The Thorn Birds, by Colleen McCullough
 The Lymond Chronicles and The House of Niccolò, Renaissance-set novel series by Dorothy Dunnett
 The Vorkosigan Saga, by Lois McMaster Bujold
 White Teeth, by Zadie Smith
 The Witcher, by Andrzej Sapkowski

Film and television

 American Pop
 Arrested Development
 The Best of Youth, in Italian La Meglio Gioventù
 Blackadder
 Dark
 Game of Thrones
 The Godfather
 Heimat
 Household Saints
 How the West Was Won
 I, Claudius
 In a Land of Plenty
 JoJo's Bizarre Adventure
 Our Friends in the North
 Roots
 Roots: The Next Generations
 Star Wars
 Succession
 Sunshine
 Taken
 The Thorn Birds
 The Dirtwater Dynasty
 This Is Us
 Vacas

References

 
Historical novels subgenres